The near-close near-back rounded vowel, or near-high near-back rounded vowel, is a type of vowel sound, used in some spoken languages. It is informally called "horseshoe u". Prior to 1989, there was an alternative IPA symbol for this sound, called "closed omega"; use of this symbol is no longer sanctioned by the IPA. In Americanist phonetic notation, the symbol  (a small capital U) is used. Sometimes, especially in broad transcription, this vowel is transcribed with a simpler symbol , which technically represents the close back rounded vowel.

Handbook of the International Phonetic Association defines  as a mid-centralized (lowered and centralized) close back rounded vowel (transcribed  or ), and the current official IPA name of the vowel transcribed with the symbol  is near-close near-back rounded vowel. It occurs in some dialects of English (such as General American and Geordie) as well as some other languages (such as Maastrichtian Limburgish). It can be transcribed with the symbol  (a lowered ) in narrow transcription. For the close-mid (near-)back rounded vowel that is not usually transcribed with the symbol  (or ), see close-mid back rounded vowel.

There may be phonological reasons not to use the first symbol, as it may incorrectly imply a relation to the fully close . It also implies too weak a rounding in some cases (specifically in the case of the vowels that are described as tense in Germanic languages, which are typically transcribed with ), which would have to be specified as  anyway.

A few languages also have the near-close back unrounded vowel in their inventory.

Near-close back protruded vowel 
As there is no dedicated diacritic for protrusion in the IPA, symbol for the near-close back rounded vowel with an old diacritic for labialization, can be used as an ad hoc symbol  for the near-close back protruded vowel.

Features 

 The prototypical  is somewhat further front (near-back) than the neighboring cardinal vowels.
 The prototypical  has a weak protruded rounding, more like  than the neighboring cardinal vowels.

Occurrence 
Because back rounded vowels are assumed to have protrusion, and few descriptions cover the distinction, some of the following may actually have compression.

Near-close back compressed vowel 

Some languages, such as Norwegian, are found with a near-close back vowel that has a distinct type of rounding, called compressed or exolabial.

There is no dedicated diacritic for compression in the IPA. The spread-lip diacritic  may also be used with a rounded vowel letter  as an ad hoc symbol, though technically 'spread' means unrounded.

Only the Shanghainese dialect is known to contrast this with the more typical protruded (endolabial) near-close back vowel, although the height of both of these vowels varies from close to close-mid.

Features 

 The prototypical  has a weak rounding (though it is protruded, rather than compressed), more like  than the neighboring cardinal vowels.

Occurrence

Notes

References

External links
 
 

Near-close vowels
Back vowels
Rounded vowels